Brooklyn's Don Diva is the first mixtape by American rapper Foxy Brown. Released on May 13, 2008, it was intended to be the follow-up to 2001's Broken Silence. According to Rolling Stone magazine, the album would be released prior to Black Roses, the album that she has been working on since 2004 and was recorded in Chung King Studios in New York City. Several tracks ("When the Lights Go Out", "We Don't Surrender", "Star Cry") have been released to iTunes, as intended singles to promote the album. Three of the albums tracks were produced by Polish beatmaker Matheo.

The album's release had been delayed multiple times, primarily due to Foxy Brown's jail sentence. It sold only about 30,000 copies in the US.

Chart performance
The album peaked at No. 83 on the Billboard 200 chart, No. 8 on the Independent Albums chart, and No. 5 on the Top R&B/Hip-Hop Albums chart.

Track listing
"Brooklyn's Don Diva" – 2:36
"We Don't Surrender" (featuring Grafh) – 4:06
"We're On Fire" (featuring Mavado) – 4:23
"Dreams of Fucking a D-Boy" (featuring Jay Rush) – 3:09
"When the Lights Go Out" (featuring Kira) – 3:35
"Never Heard This Before" (featuring Dwele) – 4:12
"Too Real" (featuring AZ) – 2:54
"Star Cry" – 4:30
"Why" – 4:12
"She Wanna Rude Bwoy" (featuring Demarco) – 3:30
"The Quan" (featuring Lady Saw) – 3:47
"Bulletproof Love/One Love" (featuring Lil' Mo) – 3:49
"How We Get Down" (featuring Grafh and Prinz) – 4:30
"We Set the Pace" (featuring Morgan Heritage and Spragga Benz) – 4:25
"The Quan" (Bonus Track) (featuring Lady Saw) (Hip Hop Mix) – 3:45

Notes
 – Originally set to be on her shelved studio album, Ill Na Na 2: The Fever

See also
2008 in hip hop

References

2008 mixtape albums
Foxy Brown (rapper) albums
E1 Music compilation albums
Albums recorded at Chung King Studios